Lina Dencik is the Co-Director of the Data Justice Lab at the University of Cardiff. She is Professor at Cardiff's School of Journalism, Media and Culture. She specialises in digital surveillance and the politics of data. Previously she worked as a television producer/director at Brook Lapping Productions in London.

Published works

References

Living people
Year of birth missing (living people)
Place of birth missing (living people)
Nationality missing
Academics of Cardiff University
British women academics
21st-century social scientists
British women social scientists
British women non-fiction writers